Thomas Vasiliou (born 28 July 1994) is a Greek professional footballer who plays as a winger for Super League 2 club Niki Volos.

Honours
Volos
 Football League: 2018–19

References

1994 births
Living people
Greek expatriate footballers
Super League Greece players
Super League Greece 2 players
Football League (Greece) players
Czech National Football League players
Serie C players
Gamma Ethniki players
Atromitos F.C. players
Ionikos F.C. players
Ilisiakos F.C. players
Olympia Radotín players
F.C. Rieti players
Volos N.F.C. players
Niki Volos F.C. players
Association football forwards
Footballers from Athens
Greek footballers